Statistics of Allsvenskan in season 1943/1944.

Overview
The league was contested by 12 teams, with Malmö FF winning the championship.

League table

Results

References 

Allsvenskan seasons
1943–44 in Swedish association football leagues
Sweden